Aegiphila skutchii is a species of flowering plant in the family Lamiaceae. It is native to Guatemala, Honduras, and Mexico.

References

skutchii
Flora of Guatemala
Flora of Honduras
Flora of Mexico
Vulnerable plants
Taxonomy articles created by Polbot